AJA University of Command and Staff (acronym: , DĀFOOS), formerly named War University is the staff college of Islamic Republic of Iran Army (Artesh), located in Tehran. The academy is a subdivision of Joint Staff of Islamic Republic of Iran Army and offers Masters of Military Art and Science courses to personnel of all four military branches of Artesh with the rank of Major and higher. The university also provides courses for foreign officers of countries with a close relationship with Iran.

See also 
 IRGC University of Command and Staff

References 

Educational institutions established in 1935
Staff colleges
1935 establishments in Iran
Islamic Republic of Iran Army
Universities in Tehran
Military education and training in Iran